Torrecampo is a surname of Spanish origin. It is prevalent among Filipinos.

Notable people with the surname include:

Rustico Torrecampo (born 1972), a retired Filipino professional boxer

See also
Filipino name
Spanish naming customs
Catálogo alfabético de apellidos, book of surnames distributed by decree to Filipinos

References

Surnames